This is a list of lighthouses in Saint Vincent and the Grenadines.

Lighthouses

See also
 Lists of lighthouses and lightvessels

References

External links
 

Saint Vincent and the Grenadines
Lighthouses
Lighthouses